Romania attempted to debut in the Eurovision Song Contest 1993, held that year in Millstreet, Ireland, being one of seven countries interested in taking part in the contest for the first time. A national final, Selecția Națională 1993 organized by Romanian Television (TVR), was held on 16 January 1993, and "Nu pleca" (English: "Don't go"), written and performed by the Romanian singer Dida Drăgan and composed by Adrian Ordean, was selected to be the Romanian entry. For a place in the finals of the contest, Romania had to compete in a pre-qualifying round, Kvalifikacija za Millstreet, that took place in Ljubljana, Slovenia. The song ranked last, and so failed to qualify for the finals in Ireland. Predominantly negative reactions from Romanian media followed as a result of Drăgan's poor performance.

Before Eurovision

Romanian Television (TVR) organized the Selecția Națională 1993 on 16 January 1993, a national final to select Romania's entrant for the Eurovision Song Contest 1993. A winner out of the 11 competing entries—"Nu pleca" by Dida Drăgan—was announced by Institutul Român de Sondare an Opiniei Publice (IRSOP), who added up the votes of 1100 households in Romania. Although the rest of the result was not publicly revealed, local media speculated that Laurenţiu Cazan and Laura Stoica reached second and third place respectively. The competing entries were:

At Kvalifikacija za Millstreet
With the breakup of Yugoslavia, many countries became interested in competing in the Eurovision Song Contest. Subsequently, the European Broadcasting Union (EBU) decided to hold the pre-qualifying round Kvalifikacija za Millstreet to select three out of seven interested countries to join the ones already competing in the 1993 contest in Millstreet, Ireland. The pre-qualifying round was hosted on 3 April 1993 in Ljubljana, Slovenia, by Radiotelevizija Slovenija (RTV SLO). Romania was the fifth country to perform its song, following Hungary and preceding Slovenia. Drăgan came in last place and failed to qualify, receiving 38 points. 12 points were awarded by Croatia, six by Slovakia and five by Bosnia and Herzegovina, Estonia, Hungary and Slovenia. The Eurovision site does not count the year in Romania's list of appearances.

Voting

Reactions and reception
Drăgan's poor result attracted overwhelming criticism from the Romanian media. An editor of Evenimentul Zilei accused IRSOP of conspiracy and arranged voting, seeing Laurențiu Cazan as the real winner of Selecția Națională. They also stated that TVR failed to inform the Romanian public about Eurovision, resulting in the rock-inspired "Nu pleca" being sent to the pop-centered Eurovision Song Contest. Adevărul also noted the rock nature of Drăgan's performance, attributing it to her outfit, vocal delivery and movements. Libertatea saw the event as the "artistic suicide of Dida Drăgan", and România Liberă criticized her vocals. Contrary to the negative reviews of 1993, an editor of EuroVisionary, looking retrospectively at Drăgan's performance, stated: "Undoubtedly, the most passionate and dramatic performance of the evening. Dida moved her hands as if life depended on them, and her voice was giving life to the lyrics". However, they slightly criticized her show as being over-the-top.

References

1993
Countries in the Eurovision Song Contest 1993
Eurovision